Pterolophia humerosa is a species of beetle in the family Cerambycidae. It was described by James Thomson in 1865. It contains the varietas Pterolophia humerosa var. innotata.

References

humerosa
Beetles described in 1865